Rocket Lab USA, Inc. is an American publicly traded aerospace manufacturer and launch service provider, with a New Zealand subsidiary. The company operates lightweight Electron orbital rockets, which provide dedicated launches for small satellites. Rocket Lab also plans to build a larger Neutron rocket as early as 2024. Electron rockets have launched 33 times from either Rocket Lab's Launch Complex 1 in New Zealand or the Mid-Atlantic Regional Spaceport in the United States. Two attempts have been made at recovery of the Electron booster. As of 2022, Rocket Lab is developing the bigger Neutron reusable unibody rocket; Photon satellite buses; and Rutherford, Curie, HyperCurie, and Archimedes rocket engines.

The company was founded in New Zealand in 2006. By 2009, the successful launch of Ātea-1 made Rocket Lab the first private company in the Southern Hemisphere to reach space. The company established headquarters in California in 2013 and developed the expendable Electron rocket. The first launch of the rocket took place in May 2017. In August 2021, Rocket Lab became a public company, listed on the Nasdaq stock exchange through a SPAC merger. In May 2022, after four years of development, the Electron booster attempted recovery by a helicopter.

Rocket Lab also builds and operates satellites for the Space Development Agency, a space-based missile defense program of the United States Space Force established by Michael D. Griffin (who later became a Rocket Lab board member) in his role as Under Secretary of Defense for Research and Engineering during Trump administration. Rocket Lab's participation drew controversy in New Zealand, where members of parliament noted the company is contributing to the "weaponization of space" and could be in violation of New Zealand's nuclear-free zone laws.
The Union of Concerned Scientists warns SDA will escalate global tensions and called the project "fundamentally destabilizing".

In 2021, Rocket Lab had 525 staff in New Zealand and about 150 in the rest of the world, mostly the United States. The acquisition of SolAero added 425 staff members in the United States in January 2022.

History

Founding (2006–2012) 
Rocket Lab was founded in June 2006 by Peter Beck from New Zealand, after a trip to the United States. While contacting potential investors, he met Mark Rocket, who would become a key seed investor to Rocket Lab and was co-Director from 2007 to 2011. Other investors to the company includes Stephen Tindall, Vinod Khosla, and the New Zealand Government.

Rocket Lab became the first private company in the Southern Hemisphere to reach space after launching its Ātea-1 sounding rocket in November 2009. The payload was not recovered, as it was deemed to be unnecessary. The payload was a ballistic instrumentation dart and its trajectory depended only on the boost phase of flight. The launch took place off the coast of New Zealand, from the private island (the Great Mercury Island) of Michael Fay, a New Zealand banker and Rocket Lab investor. A second early investor was Stephen Tindall, a New Zealand entrepreneur.

In December 2010, Rocket Lab was awarded a U.S. government contract from the Operationally Responsive Space Office (ORS) to study a low cost space launcher to place CubeSats into orbit. The agreement with NASA enabled the company to contract for limited NASA resources such as personnel, facilities, and equipment for commercial launch efforts.

Moving to United States (2013–2020) 

Around 2013, the company moved its registration from New Zealand to the United States, and opened headquarters in Huntington Beach, California. The move coincided with the company receiving funding from American sources, and was in part due to increased U.S. government involvement in the company. The New Zealand company became a subsidiary of the American company. In 2020, Rocket Lab moved its headquarters to Long Beach, California.

In 2013, additional funding was obtained from Khosla Ventures, and Callaghan Innovation (a Crown entity of New Zealand). Bessemer Venture Partners invested in 2014 and Lockheed Martin became a strategic investor in 2015. Rocket Lab announced in March 2017 that it had raised an additional US$75 million in a Series D equity round led by Data Collective with participation by Promus Ventures and several previous investors. In May 2017, the investments of Callaghan Innovation was reported to total NZ$15 million. In November 2018, the company reported raising a US$150 million Series E round led by Future Fund. The first NASA mission, launched in 2018, was valued by the space agency at US$6.9 million (with launch services, etc., included).

In 2018, Rocket Lab began to develop reusable first-stage technology, after previously stating publicly that they had no intention of attempting to recover and then reuse their small low-cost launch vehicles. They disclosed the effort to study the potential recovery of an Electron first stage in August 2019, aiming to use a parachute and mid-air retrieval, with a goal of a stage recovery attempt before mid-2020. In December 2019, they flight tested the reentry technology — a Rocket Lab proprietary aerothermal decelerator — on Electron flight number 10, and were able to decelerate the rocket and successfully bring it through the space-to-dense-atmosphere transition. They did not attempt to recover the rocket on this first test; but they planned to add guided parachutes to future test flights, to recover the booster by snagging the rocket with a helicopter in the lower atmosphere.

In March 2020, the company announced that it had acquired Sinclair Interplanetary, a Canadian manufacturer of components for small satellites. Rocket Lab said that it will use Sinclair technology on its Photon line of small satellite buses, and that it would help Sinclair increase production of small satellite components for sale to other firms. Since then, Rocket Lab has launched a variety of missions with some or all of the payload being made by Sinclair Interplanetary.

Trading as a public company (2021–present) 
In March 2021, the company announced that it was planning to go public through an initial public offering (IPO) of stock in the second quarter of 2021. The company planned to accomplish the IPO through a merger with a special-purpose acquisition company (SPAC) called Vector Acquisition Corporation (VACQ). The deal had been rumored and some details of the impending deal had leaked out the previous day in New Zealand news outlets. The merger was planned to value Rocket Lab at US$4.1 billion and provide the company with US$790 million in working capital in order to begin development of a new medium-lift two-stage-to-orbit launch vehicle called Neutron, aiming for the mega-constellation satellite deployment market. Neutron was planned to be partially reusable with the booster stage returning to land on an ocean platform, to be refurbished and launched again.

Rocket Lab began trading on the Nasdaq on 25 August 2021 after it merged with SPAC Vector Acquisition, which valued Rocket Lab at $4.8 billion in equity, and the transaction added $777 million in gross cash proceeds. At the time of going public, Rocket Lab had over 500 employees and it had launched 105 satellites into orbit up to that point in time. Rocket Lab's launch business booked revenues of $13.5 million in 2018, $48 million in 2019 and an estimated $33 million in 2020. Rocket Lab expects to spend about $200 million of the cash gained from going public to develop its next-generation rocket Neutron. Rocket Lab aims to launch Neutron for the first time by 2024.

As of August 2021, Rocket Lab intended to build a new factory in the U.S. to build the rockets as well as new launch infrastructure for Neutron at the Mid-Atlantic Regional Spaceport in Virginia. In October 2021, the company acquired Advanced Solutions, Inc (ASI), a Colorado-based spacecraft flight software company. In November 2021, the company acquired Planetary Systems Corporation (PSC), a manufacturer of satellite separation systems for $81.4 million. In January 2022, the company acquired SolAero, a supplier of space solar power products.

On May 3, 2022, the company launched its Electron rocket from New Zealand, hoping to recover it for the first time. It was able to capture the falling rocket booster in mid air, a historic first.  Beck later said that the booster was hanging improperly, so it was allowed to parachute into the water where it was pulled out by a ship.

In August 2022, Rocket Lab revealed plans to become the first private company to reach Venus. The company is building a small probe, called the Venus Life Finder (VLF), with the ability to fly through Venus's upper atmosphere for roughly five minutes between 29 and 37 miles above the planets' surface. The target launch date aboard the Electron rocket is May 2023 with the goal of reaching Venus in October.

Hardware

Ātea sounding rocket 
The first launch of the Ātea (Māori for "space") sub-orbital sounding rocket occurred in late 2009. It was intended to carry scientific payloads or possibly personal items. A project for Ātea-2 was developed, but never launched.

Ātea-1, named Manu Karere or Bird Messenger by the local Māori iwi, was successfully launched from Great Mercury Island near the Coromandel Peninsula on 30 November 2009 at 01:23 UTC (14:23 local time) after fueling problems delayed the scheduled 20:10 UTC (07:10 local time) liftoff. The rocket was tracked by GPS uplink to the Inmarsat-B satellite constellation; it splashed down approximately  downrange. The payload had no telemetry downlink, but had instrumentation including the launch vehicle's uplink to Inmarsat. Payload was not required to be recovered, being only a dart, and the company advised that should it be encountered by vessels at sea, the payload should not be handled as it was "potentially hazardous" and contained delicate instruments. However, performance characteristics were completely determined by the boost stage, which did have downlink telemetry and was recovered. A second launch of Ātea-1 was not attempted.

Electron orbital rocket 

Electron is a two-stage launch vehicle which uses Rocket Lab's Rutherford liquid engines on both stages. The vehicle is capable of delivering payloads of 150 kg to a 500 km Sun-synchronous orbit, the target range for the growing small satellite market. The projected cost is less than US$5 million per launch.

The Rutherford engine uses pumps that are uniquely driven by battery-powered electric motors rather than a gas generator, expander, or preburner. The engine is fabricated largely by 3D printing, via electron beam melting, whereby layers of metal powder are melted in a high vacuum by an electron beam rather than a laser. By March 2016, the  second-stage Rutherford engine had completed firing tests. The first test flight took place on 25 May 2017 at 04:20 UTC from Māhia Peninsula in New Zealand's North Island.

On 21 January 2018 at 01:43 UTC, their second rocket, on a flight named "Still Testing", launched, reached orbit and deployed three CubeSats for customers Planet Labs and Spire Global. Humanity Star re-entered Earth's atmosphere and burned up in March 2018. On 11 November 2018, the first commercial launch (third launch in total) of Electron occurred from Māhia Peninsula carrying satellites for Spire Global, GeoOptics, a CubeSat built by high school students, and a prototype of a dragsail.

On 4 July 2020, an issue during the second-stage burn of flight 13, named "Pics or It Didn't Happen", caused Electron to fail to get into orbit and its payloads were lost. On 19 November 2020, a successful launch mission named "Return to Sender" deployed its payload of 29 small sats into orbit. In addition to satellite deployment, a new method of the first stage recovery was successfully implemented. "After stage separation, the first stage will reorient itself for reentry, then deploy a drogue parachute and a larger main parachute before splashing down in the Pacific Ocean about 400 kilometers from the launch site". On 15 May 2021, the company launched the mission "Running Out Of Toes" which successfully utilized the first stage recovery method like the one used on "Return to Sender". However, the rocket failed to place its payload of two BlackSky satellites into orbit after an issue occurred with the second stage. On 15 September 2022, Rocket Lab launched "The Owl Spreads Its Wings" mission, sending a radar satellite into Earth orbit.

Neutron reusable rocket 

Rocket Lab announced in March 2021 that they were developing a new medium-lift two-stage human rated launch vehicle called Neutron, capable of launching an  payload to low Earth orbit. Rocket Lab have said they are going to aim to make the first stage of the vehicle reusable with landings planned on a floating landing platform downrange in the ocean. During a Q&A with space and rocket communicator Scott Manley, Peter Beck indicated a preference to avoid fixed assets like landing barges indicating design work proceeded on the basis that the Neutron would return for landing.

Neutron launches are intended to take place from the Mid-Atlantic Regional Spaceport on the eastern coast of Virginia, by modifying the existing launch pad infrastructure at Launch Pad 0A (LP-0A). In March 2022, Rocket Lab announced that Neutron will be built at a facility adjacent to Launch Complex 2 at the Mid-Atlantic Regional Spaceport (being used for Electron launches). Ground was broken for this facility on April 11, 2022. As of March 2021, the company is planning for the first launch no earlier than 2024.

Photon satellite bus 

Based on Rocket Lab's Electron kick stage, Photon is a satellite bus. It uses the company's Curie engine and communicates on S-band. In October 2019, Rocket Lab announced plans to use Photon to launch small payloads into lunar orbit as soon as fourth quarter 2020. A modified version of Photon would have bigger propellant tanks and the HyperCurie engine for interplanetary missions. The low Earth orbit version of Photon can take  to Sun-synchronous orbit. The interplanetary version will have a  payload capacity. HyperCurie is an evolution of the Curie engine, which comes in a monopropellant version and a bipropellant version, while the HyperCurie is a hypergolic version. HyperCurie is electrically pumped.

The first satellite to use the Photon bus (or a demo-version of it) was Photon Pathfinder, Rocket Lab's first in-house designed and built Photon demonstration satellite. It was launched aboard an Electron rocket on 13 June 2020. The second Photon satellite was the First Light satellite. It was launched aboard Electron rocket on 31 August 2020 on the 14th Electron mission "I Can't Believe It's Not Optical". On that mission, the Electron rocket lifted First Light and the customer satellite, Capella 2, to orbit; then the First Light satellite, acting in the capacity of a kick stage (final rocket stage which inserts the payload satellite into desired orbit), inserted the customer satellite into its orbit and then went on to begin its own orbital mission as a standalone satellite. First Light thus had a dual role in the mission: first as the final rocket stage delivering the customer satellite and then as a standalone satellite. The purpose of First Light standalone mission is to demonstrate the new (as compared to "plain" kick stage) systems for operating in orbit as a long-duration standalone satellite. To demonstrate Photon bus' payload hosting, the First Light had a low-resolution video camera.

Viscous liquid monopropellant 
In 2012, Rocket Lab demonstrated a rocket propelled by a Viscous Liquid Monopropellant (VLM) developed in work sponsored by DARPA and the Office of Naval Research (NRL). The VLM was reported to be thixotropic, so that it behaves as a pseudo solid until a shear force is applied, at which point it flows like a liquid. The VLM was reported to have a density comparable to solid-rocket fuels, with a specific gravity of about 1.72, whereas the specific gravity of liquid rocket fuels was reported to rarely be above 1. The VLM reportedly required no special handling, was non-toxic, water soluble, had low sensitivity to shock, a high ignition point, and was barely flammable in atmosphere. Rocket Lab has been issued  on a Viscous Liquid Monopropellant which discloses additional details.

Facilities

Manufacturing 

In October 2018, Rocket Lab revealed their new manufacturing facility in Auckland, New Zealand. It is intended for the production of propellant tanks and stage builds, and is in charge of the overall integration of launch vehicles at Launch Complex 1. The company's headquarters in Long Beach, California, produces their Rutherford engines and avionics.

Launch Complex 1 

After encountering difficulty in obtaining resource consent for the Kaitorete Spit launch site, Rocket Lab announced in November 2015 that its primary launch site would be on the Māhia Peninsula, east of Wairoa in the North Island, New Zealand. The site is licensed to launch rockets every 72 hours for 30 years. Rocket Lab Launch Complex 1 (LC-1A) was officially opened on 26 September 2016 (UTC; 27 September NZDT). , a second pad on Māhia Peninsula named Launch Complex 1B was under construction. On 28 February 2022, Launch Complex 1B hosted its first launch: "The Owl's Night Continues".

Launch Complex 2 

In October 2018, after several months of search, the company announced their selection of the Mid-Atlantic Regional Spaceport (MARS) at NASA's Wallops Flight Facility as their second launch site. The site was chosen for a number of factors: the speed and ease in which the new pad could be built due to infrastructure readiness, the low number of launches from other companies, and the location's ability to supplement orbital inclinations provided by LC-1. It was expected to be capable of monthly launches serving United States government and commercial missions. Launch Complex 2 (LC-2) is located within the fence line of MARS Launch Pad 0A. In December 2019, construction of the launch pad was completed and Rocket Lab inaugurated the LC-2.

In March 2021, Rocket Lab announced that they would modify the pad infrastructure at Launch Complex 0A in order to be able to launch the medium-lift launch vehicle Neutron from LP-0A, with the initial launch planned for as early as 2024. This plan was later abandoned, and a new launch pad for Neutron will be built at MARS.

The first launch from LC-2 happened on 24 January 2023. An Electron rocket successfully orbited 3 satellites.

See also

References

External links 

 
 

 
2013 establishments in California
Aerospace companies of New Zealand
Aerospace companies of the United States
American companies established in 2006
Commercial launch service providers
Companies based in Huntington Beach, California
Companies listed on the Nasdaq
Manufacturing companies based in Greater Los Angeles
New Zealand companies established in 2006
New Zealand subsidiaries of foreign companies
Private spaceflight companies
Rocket engine manufacturers of the United States
Sounding rockets of New Zealand
Special-purpose acquisition companies
Transport companies established in 2006
Transport companies of New Zealand
Vehicle manufacturing companies established in 2006